The Air Base Alpnach (ICAO code LSMA) is a Swiss Air Force airfield near the town Alpnach in Canton of Obwalden in Switzerland.

History 
As early as 1929 there was a landing strip at Alpnach. In 1940 two wooden hangars were added and in September 1942, Flying Section 7 was based at Alpnach. This is considered the official start of the airfield.

The first concrete runway was built in 1943 between Eichistrasse and Lake Alpnach. Furthermore, eight type U-43 aircraft shelters and bunkers for command and ammunition were built.

As part of the Swiss Reduitstrategie in 1952 aircraft caverns were built into the rock of the adjacent Mueterschwanderberg Mountain.  The former Mueterschwanderberg artillery fortress was also built into the mountain, but on the Nidwalden. In 1960, the cavern facility was officially handed over to the Directorate of Military airfields. Beginning in 1958, de Havilland DH-112 Venom jets operated from Alpnach. In 1973, they changed to the Hawker Hunter and in 1979 there was a further change to the F-5 "Tiger". Because of the Army XXI reforms, flight operations from the caverns were terminated. On 20 January 1964, the Army helicopter base opened at Alpnach.

The Highway A8 at Alpnach was built so that it could be used as a takeoff and landing runway and was associated with temporary taxiways with the cavern. However, only take-off were made for safety reasons, the landings were made on the normal runway.

From 1947 to 1994, the 19th Squadron was stationed in Alpnach.

In 1994 the last Swiss Armed Forces training courses took place at Alpnach, and on 23 September 1995 the last Tiger F-5E left. In 2004, Air Base Alpnach was threatened with the closure of the airfield, but the Obwalden government successfully lobbied for the airfield.

In May 2012, began renovation work on Hangar 2 and 3 and the new building for the Hangar 4.

Today 
Alpnach Air Base is the main logistical base of the helicopter of the Swiss Air Force. Standard helicopter types used at Air Base Alpnach are the Aérospatiale Super Puma, Eurocopter AS532UL Cougar Mk1 and Eurocopter EC 635.

Other uses
The RUAG Switzerland AG operates on the airfield a location for the maintenance of civil and military helicopter.
The airfield is used for various other uses. The runways may be used outside normal operating hours of the airport, for example by in-line skaters. A model airplane club uses the southern half of the airfield .

See also
RUAG
Military significance of Switzerlands Motorways

External links 

 Flugplatzkommando Alpnach, mit Übersichtsplan Schweizer Luftwaffe
 Flugplatz Alpnach, Flugplatzkommando 2 private Webseite mit Informationen zur Geschichte des Flugplatzes
 Fotos vom Flugplatz auf der Website des Restaurants Alouette auf dem Flugplatz
Militärflugplatz Autobahn (PDF), Artikel über Autobahnstarts und -landungen, unter anderem Starts bei Alpnach mit F-5

References

Airports in Switzerland
Military airbases in Switzerland